Pergine Valdarno is a frazione of Laterina Pergine Valdarno in the Province of Arezzo in the Italian region Tuscany, located about  southeast of Florence and about  west of Arezzo. The American architect Craig Ellwood died there on May 30, 1992.

References

Cities and towns in Tuscany